Play is a 1991 album by the British new wave group Squeeze. It is the band's ninth album, and their only released by Reprise Records. It is the first LP in the Squeeze discography to feature only four official members instead of five (Steve Nieve took on many of the keyboard duties that would have gone to Jools Holland in the past).  Tony Berg produced the album. In the liner notes to the 1996 Squeeze compilation Excess Moderation, Glenn Tilbrook stated that he considers Play the beginning of Squeeze's "renaissance period." The album spent one week at number 41 in the UK Albums Chart in September 1991.

The liner notes to the album are, appropriately, in the form of a play that incorporates the lyrics of the songs in a script that also references the plays Our Town by Thornton Wilder and Waiting for Godot by Samuel Beckett.

Recording
Play was recorded in Greenwich, London at WoodWharf Studios.

Critical reception

Play received some positive reception from critics. Stewart Mason of AllMusic proclaimed the record to be "probably Squeeze's best post-reunion album", naming the tracks "The Truth" and "Walk a Straight Line" as "particular highlights".

Track listing
All songs written by Chris Difford and Glenn Tilbrook.
 "Satisfied" – 5:10
 "Crying in My Sleep" – 5:03
 "Letting Go" – 5:01
 "The Day I Get Home" – 4:50
 "The Truth" – 4:12
 "House of Love" – 3:23
 "Cupid's Toy" – 4:31
 "Gone to the Dogs" – 3:54
 "Walk a Straight Line" – 3:50
 "Sunday Street" – 4:16
 "Wicked and Cruel" – 4:14
 "There Is a Voice" – 4:01

Personnel
Squeeze
 Chris Difford – guitars, backing vocals
 Glenn Tilbrook – keyboards, acoustic guitar, electric guitar, lead and backing vocals
 Keith Wilkinson – bass, backing vocals
 Gilson Lavis – drums, percussion 

Additional musicians
 Tony Berg – keyboards, guitars
 Bruce Hornsby – accordion
 Matt Irving – acoustic piano, organ, accordion
 Steve Nieve – acoustic piano, organ, harpsichord
 Dan Higgins, Larry Williams, Bill Reichenbach Jr., Gary Grant and Jerry Hey – horns
 John Acevedo, Bob Becker, Larry Corbett, Joel Derouin, Armen Garabedian, Berj Garabedian, Suzie Katayama and Sid Page – strings
 Claudia Fontaine – backing vocals (4, 10)
 Beverly Skeete – backing vocals (4, 10)
 Laurence Johnson – backing vocals (7)
 Paul Lee – backing vocals (7)
Choir on "The Day I Get Home"
 Betsy Petrie, Blanche Black, Mary Jo Braun, Wendie Colter, Christopher Guest, Gabriele Morgan, Michael McKean, Michael Penn, Betsy Petrie and Steven Soles

Production
 Squeeze – arrangements
 Tony Berg – producer, arrangements 
 Chris Lord-Alge – basic track recording 
 Ken Jordan – overdub recording 
 Steve Reincoff – overdub recording
 Bob Clearmountain – mixing 
 Ronnie Box – recording assistant 
 Chris Lawson – recording assistant 
 Terry Medhurst – recording assistant
 Kim Champagne – art direction 
 Jeff Gold – art direction 
 Enrique Badulescu – photography 
 Miles Copeland III – management 
 John Lay – management

References

External links
 Album summary

Squeeze (band) albums
1991 albums
Albums produced by Tony Berg